Emilie Pine (born 1978) is a writer and lecturer in modern drama at University College Dublin (UCD).  Her story, Notes to self, shows events in her private life.

Biography 
Pine was born in 1978. She lived in Dublin before her family moved to London. 

She returned to Ireland to complete her education at Trinity College, Dublin. While teaching at UCD, she has made books on stories and difficulties in Ireland and how people remember these events.

Up to 2019, Pine had made books on true educational stories, she then made the book, Notes to self. Notes to Self tells her private stories about not having children, problem eating, problem drinking, becoming unmarried, forced sex, losing babies, being poor, body hair and thinking bad about these acts. Josefin Holmström said in Svenska Dagbladet that Pine's book showed a new way of talking about private female things. The book won the 2018 An Post Irish Book Awards book of the year prize.

Before 2022, Pine had a year's holiday from teaching to create her book Ruth & Pen, a story of two women over one day in the same way James Joyce's Ulysses was set over one day.

Works 

 Emilie Pine (2005). "Maculate conceptions : Irish film and drama of the 1930s" (en-IE).

References

External links 

 University College Dublin official website

Irish scholars and academics
Academics of University College Dublin
Irish novelists
People from County Dublin
Living people
1977 births